Project Weber/RENEW is a peer-led harm reduction and recovery support center in Providence, Rhode Island.

Opioid overdoses are a leading cause of accidental death in Rhode Island. Project Weber/RENEW is one of the largest distributors of Narcan in the state.

Origins

Creation of Project RENEW 
In 2006, Colleen Daley Ndoye started Project Revitalizing & Engaging Neighborhoods by Empowering Women (RENEW), which offered supportive services to women who engage in sex work in Pawtucket and Central Falls. Project RENEW's original mission was advocating for alternatives to arrest, encouraging law enforcement to connect people who engaged in drug use and/or street-based sex work to RENEW's services. Cheryl "Whoopi" Robinson was the first peer outreach specialist Project RENEW hired. Robinson was paid through a grant. After two years of RENEW's existence, prostitution arrests in both Pawtucket and Central Falls had dropped 90% due to RENEW's work.

Creation of Project Weber 
In 2008, Project Weber was founded by Rich Holcomb and James Waterman, in Providence, as the first supportive services in America to exclusively serve men who engage in sex work. The project was named in honor of Roy Weber, a 19-year-old sex worker who was found murdered on Allens Avenue in Providence on Christmas Day in 2003. To learn how to open a drop-in center for men who engage in sex work, Holcomb and Waterman visited Project Rezo in Montreal, Canada, and Project Sance in Prague, Czech Republic. Project Weber opened its first drop-in center in 2013. After two years of running the drop-in center and nearly seven years of complete abstinence from drugs and alcohol, Holcomb relapsed and resigned as director of Project Weber. The merger into Project Weber/RENEW occurred, in part, to sustain the work of Project Weber, after Holcomb's departure as director. Holcomb continues to be involved in the organization.

Merger into Project Weber/RENEW 
In 2016, Project Weber and Project RENEW merged to become Project Weber/RENEW, and created a program to support transgender, gender non-conforming, and non-binary communities. PW/R is funded by the Rhode Island Department of Health. Weber/RENEW's interventions include education, distribution of harm reduction supplies, peer-led street outreach, addressing basic needs, HIV prevention testing, support groups, and case management.

Locations

Outreach 
In December 2017, Joseph "Joey" Cintron, a beloved client of Weber/RENEW, died of a fentanyl overdose at age 24. In July 2018, Cintron's sister, Erica Tierney, donated her Honda Odyssey van to the organization out of gratitude for their support of Cintron. The van is used as a mobile office for outreach workers to serve clients in Providence, Central Falls, and Pawtucket.

In 2021, Weber/RENEW began doing outreach and distributing harm reduction supplies in Kennedy Plaza from 10 am to 2 pm on weekdays. The organization also successfully pushed RIPTA to reopen their Kennedy Plaza bathrooms.

Drop-in centers 
In 2021, Weber/RENEW opened a drop-in center in Providence run by peers in recovery.

In June 2022, Weber/RENEW opened a second drop-in center in Pawtucket run by peers in recovery.

Demographics 
Staff and clients at P/WR range in age from 18 to their 60s or 70s. The majority of staff are LGBTQ and BIPOC. Many of Weber/RENEW's staff are former sex workers, several are HIV positive, and staff represent a huge range of recovery pathways.

Work

COVID-19 pandemic response 
In 2020 and 2021, Weber/RENEW was one of the only organizations in Rhode Island to continue in person harm reduction and outreach work, despite the risk of transmission at the beginning of the COVID-19 pandemic. In response to the pandemic, the organization expanded services to meet clients' basic needs. Weber/RENEW also started distributing COVID masks and cleaning supplies, hosting vaccination clinics, and sharing educational information about COVID and vaccines.

Project Weber/RENEW and its clients struggled at the beginning of the pandemic with naloxone shortages. In August 2021, on International Overdose Awareness Day, Weber/RENEW, joined Coalition To Save Lives, a group of organizations and individuals raising awareness about the overdose crisis in Rhode Island and evidence-based solutions to save lives, to protest the shortage of Narcan outside of the Executive Office of Health and Human Services (EOHHS) in Cranston. At the demonstration, participants carried coffins and staged an eight-minute die-in.

Clients and outreach workers also had trouble connecting because of the closures of highly utilized social service programs and public areas, due to fears of transmission of the virus, which led to a higher number of fatal overdoses in Rhode Island.

Statewide reclassification of drug possession charges 
In September 2021, Governor Dan McKee signed legislation that reclassified simple possession of 10 grams or less of certain controlled substances as a misdemeanor charge rather than a felony in Rhode Island. He signed the legislation at Project Weber/RENEW's office.

Collaboration with schools 
In January 2022, Project Weber/ RENEW taught a Community Leadership in Nonviolence and Substance Use Prevention class for students at Blackstone Academy Charter School, in partnership with U.S. Attorney Zachary A. Cunha, Local Initiatives Support Corporation Rhode Island, and the Nonviolence Institute.

Advocacy of supervised injection sites 
In January 2020, Project Weber/RENEW advocated for the legalization of supervised injection sites in Rhode Island.

In July 2022, Rhode Island became the first state in America to legalize supervised drug consumption sites.

In November 2022, Project Weber/RENEW and CODAC Behavioral Healthcare submitted a joint proposal to Rhode Island's Executive Office of Health and Human Services for funding to open a supervised injection site on Huntington Avenue in Providence. If the proposal is approved, $2 million in funding would come through settlement money the state of Rhode Island was paid from opioid makers. Annajane Yolken, the overdose prevention center liaison for Project Weber/RENEW, commented on the purpose of the site in The Boston Globe saying, "Dead people don't enter recovery. Our number one priority is to save lives."

Support of stimulant-users 
In 2022, Dennis Bailer, overdose prevention program director at Project Weber/RENEW, commented in Time Magazine, that the majority of Black and Hispanic crack cocaine users have received punishment and criminalization, when most white opioid users receive treatment. Bailer also spoke about the importance of improving stimulant-users' accessibility to tools designed to help to prevent opioid overdose deaths.

Outreach in Kennedy Plaza 
Project Weber/RENEW focuses much of their outreach on the Rhode Island Public Transit Authority (RIPTA) bus terminal, Kennedy Plaza. Kennedy Plaza has one of the highest rates of overdoses in Providence. In 2022, RIPTA and Providence police were criticized by The Providence Journal for not carrying Narcan in Kennedy Plaza, despite the fact that The Providence Police Department has been trained and equipped to use Narcan since 2014. Dennis Bailer, overdose prevention program director at Project Weber/RENEW, has attempted to work with RIPTA to train and assist them to respond to overdoses which had led to little response from RIPTA.

Education around xylazine 
In January 2023, Colleen Daley Ndoye, executive director of Project Weber/RENEW, commented to The Providence Journal that the presence of xylazine is dominating the drug supply in Providence. Ndoye stated, "Xylazine does not respond to naloxone, so our standard response to overdoses is not always effective." Xylazine has also been causing severe soft tissue infections in drug-users that inject. Project Weber/RENEW is focused on educating Rhode Island residents about the health risks of xylazine and connect people to medical care to treat skin infections before they become fatal.

Recognition

Awarded grants 
In 2018, Miriam Hospital received a $2.5 million federal grant to partner with Project Weber/RENEW and the Rhode Island Public Health Institute to create Rhode Island's first substance use treatment program for gay and bisexual, Black and Latino men. In 2018, Project Weber/RENEW was awarded $10,000 from the Rhode Island Foundation for advocacy and training as well as to connect high-risk transgender men and women with health and prevention services. In 2022, Emily Sloan, a 29-year-old who used to volunteer with the organization, redistributed $200,000 of her generational wealth to Project Weber/RENEW, the largest private donation Project Weber/RENEW had ever received. Sloan's gift will fund retirement plans for Project Weber/RENEW employees with lived experience of substance use disorders or homelessness.

PrideFest honor 
In June 2022, Project Weber/RENEW were named Grand Marshals for the return of PrideFest and the Illuminated Night Parade in Providence.

New York Times article 
In October 2022, Ashley Perry, a person in recovery and longterm Project Weber/RENEW employee, was featured in a Times article for her outreach contributions to Weber/RENEW's clients, including serving as an emergency contact for over twenty clients, transporting clients from the hospital after being treated for an overdose, going to court with clients, helping clients expunge their records, and working holidays to bring clients meals on outreach.

The article also honored the life and contributions of Cristina Ramsey, a long-time drug user, who worked for Project Weber during a period of sobriety, counseling clients and helping with harm reduction programs such as naloxone distribution and needle exchanges. Ramsey died in August 2022 and attributed her poor health at the end of her life to a contaminated needle. Ramsey credited Project Weber/RENEW with prolonging her life for the last two decades of it, with sterile needles, treatment, housing and friendship.

References 

Addiction medicine
Buildings and structures in Providence, Rhode Island
Drug culture
Drug paraphernalia
Drug safety
Harm reduction
Medical hygiene
Medical prevention
Medical waste
Prevention of HIV/AIDS
Public policy
Public services
Charities based in Rhode Island
Organizations based in Providence, Rhode Island
Addiction and substance abuse organizations
Drug policy
Drug policy organizations
Drug-related deaths
Early warning systems
Organizations based in Rhode Island
Organizations established in 2006
Public health
Public health organizations
Vulnerable adults
Substance intoxication
Substance abuse
Substance abuse counselors
Civil liberties advocacy groups in the United States
Human rights organizations based in the United States
Political advocacy groups in the United States
Prostitution in the United States
Sex industry in the United States
Sex worker organizations in the United States
Social justice organizations
Prison abolition movement
LGBT political advocacy groups in the United States